John Vaughan  was a Welsh politician who sat in the House of Commons  in 1654. He fought in the Royalist army in the English Civil War.

John Vaughan of Kevenbodig was a captain in the Royalist army and a commissioner of array in 1642. However, by 1654 he was accepted by the Commonwealth authorises and was elected in that year as Member of Parliament for Merioneth. His election was opposed in a petition  by Rice Vaughan of Grays Inn.

References

Year of birth missing
Year of death missing
Members of the Parliament of England (pre-1707) for constituencies in Wales
17th-century Welsh politicians
Cavaliers
English MPs 1654–1655